Rebecca "Becky" Bisland (née Stokes; born 20 June 1982) is an Irish footballer who plays for Partick Thistle in the Scottish Women's Premier League (SWPL). She has previously played in the SWPL for Celtic.

Club career
Bisland began her career at Wimbledon before moving on to Tranmere Rovers. In October 2002, Bisland scored for Northern Division club Manchester City against Doncaster Belles in the second round of the FA Women's Premier League Cup.

After spells with leading London clubs Fulham and Charlton Athletic, Bisland moved to Scotland in summer 2005 and began playing for F.C. Kilmarnock Ladies, where she played in their winning Scottish Women's Premier League Cup side. When Celtic formed a women's section in 2007, Bisland joined the new club and was named captain in the first season. She narrowly missed out on lifting silverware in her debut campaign, as Celtic lost in extra–time to Hibernian in the final of the Scottish Women's Cup.

In May 2010 Bisland set up Joanne Love's opening goal as Celtic defeated Spartans 4–1 to win the Scottish Women's Premier League Cup.

After the birth of her first daughter in 2011 Bisland moved to Queen's Park F.C. helping them to promotion in 2013. Bisland moved to Partick Thistle in 2016 after having her second daughter, and in 2018 she was voted the Partick Thistle Ladies MVP for the 2017/2018 season.

International career
Although born in England, Bisland was called up by the Republic of Ireland in May 2006 for a World Cup qualifier against Scotland at Richmond Park. Manager Noel King noted Bisland's pace and "good eye for goal."

Bisland won a cap by replacing Stef Curtis for the last half-hour of a 2–1 friendly defeat to Wales in April 2007.

Personal life
Bisland attended Liverpool John Moores University and moved to Scotland in 2005 to work as an active schools co-ordinator. She later became a disability sport regional manager.

Bisland has qualified as a teacher after studying at the University of Strathclyde.

References

External links

1982 births
Living people
Republic of Ireland women's association footballers
English people of Irish descent
Republic of Ireland women's international footballers
FA Women's National League players
Sportspeople from Epsom
Charlton Athletic W.F.C. players
Fulham L.F.C. players
Celtic F.C. Women players
F.C. Kilmarnock Ladies players
Manchester City W.F.C. players
Women's association football midfielders
Women's association football forwards
Scottish Women's Premier League players
Alumni of Liverpool John Moores University
Alumni of the University of Strathclyde